The John Ruan House is a historic mansion in the Frankford neighborhood of Philadelphia, Pennsylvania. It was built in 1796 as the home of Dr. John Ruan (June 9, 1771, St. Croix, West Indies – July 2, 1845, Bristol, Pennsylvania), a physician and community leader.

The 2½-story house, the oldest of its size and stature still standing in Frankford, was listed on the National Register of Historic Places in 1985. It was added to the Philadelphia Register of Historic Places on January 3, 1985.

It has been continuously occupied since its erection and was previously the home of the Grand Army of the Republic Civil War Museum and Library.  The museum housed Civil War and Grand Army of the Republic artifacts, books, and memorabilia. It is now privately owned.

References

External links

Grand Army of the Republic Civil War Museum and Library
"History of the Ruan House, Circa 1796" at the Grand Army of the Republic Civil War Museum and Library
Listing at Philadelphia Architects and Buildings

Museums in Philadelphia
Houses on the National Register of Historic Places in Philadelphia
Libraries in Pennsylvania
American Civil War museums in Pennsylvania
Historic house museums in Philadelphia
Georgian architecture in Pennsylvania
Houses completed in 1796
Philadelphia Register of Historic Places
Frankford, Philadelphia
1796 establishments in Pennsylvania